Bill Cosby Is Not Himself These Days - Rat Own, Rat Own, Rat Own (1976) is a musical comedy album by Bill Cosby. He parodies various rhythm and blues artists including James Brown and Barry White. The songs were written with producer and keyboardist Stu Gardner. This is also his first album on Capitol Records, his fourth musical album release overall (not counting the 1971 band project Badfoot Brown & the Bunions Bradford Funeral & Marching Band and its 1972 sequel).

Background
For nine years, Cosby released at least an album a year, starting in 1964. After a three-year hiatus, this was his first comedy album since 1973's Fat Albert, albeit in musical form, and he wouldn't return to a full-fledged stand-up album again until 1977's My Father Confused Me... What Must I Do? What Must I Do?.

The first single, "Yes, Yes, Yes", became one of Cosby's biggest charted hits after "Little Ole Man (Uptight, Everything's Alright)", reaching number 46 on the Billboard Hot 100 and number 11 on the Billboard rhythm and blues singles chart. The song spoofed Barry White's deep-voiced spoken word monologues. "Ben" was sampled by Jurassic 5 on their 2002 song "After School Special".

Track listing
 "Yes, Yes, Yes" – (Cosby/Gardner) – 3:21
 "Chick on the Side" – (Cosby/Gardner) – 3:20
 "Shift Down" – (Cosby/Gardner/Lansbury) – 4:07
 "I Luv Myself Better Than I Luv Myself" – (Cosby/Gardner) – 6:00
 "Do It to Me" – (Cosby/Gardner) – 3:22
 "Ben" – (Cosby/Gardner) – 3:22
 "You're Driving Me Crazy" – (Cosby/Gardner) – 3:59
 "Garbage Truck Lady" – (Cosby/Gardner) – 2:38
 "Luv Is" – (Cosby/Gardner) – 3:13

Personnel
 Ollie E. Brown – drums
 Bill Cosby – vocals
 Tony Drake – guitar
 Larry Farrow – keyboards
 Stu Gardner – piano
 Al Hall, Jr. – trombone
 Fred Jackson, Jr. – saxophone
 Melvin Moore – trumpet
 Nate Neblett – drums
 Ray Parker Jr. – bass, guitar
 Doug Richardson – flute, saxophone
 David Sheilds – bass
 Wah Wah Watson – guitar

References

1976 albums
Bill Cosby albums
Capitol Records albums
1970s comedy albums